The discography of progressive bluegrass group New Grass Revival spanned two decades (1972–1989), comprising nine studio albums, two live albums, and appearances on albums of other artists, including Leon Russell and Peter Rowan. Three compilation albums have been released since the group's break-up in 1989.

Albums

Studio albums

Live albums

Compilation albums

Collaborations

Singles

Videography 
 Leon Russell and New Grass Revival: The Live Video (Paradise 1981, Monarch 1994)
 Austin City Limits #905, recorded November 6, 1983 (PBS February 1984)
 New Country at the Cannery (TNN 1986)
 New Country at the Cannery (TNN 1987)
 Lonesome Pine Special, New Grass Revival (Kentucky Educational Television 1987)

Music videos

References

External links
 

Discographies of American artists
Country music discographies